The London and North Western Railway (LNWR) 7 ft 6 in Single 2-2-2 class was a type of express passenger locomotive designed by John Ramsbottom. The class is better known as the Problem class for the first locomotive built, or the Lady of the Lake class for the example that was displayed at the International Exhibition of 1862.

The first examples were built shortly after the acquisition of the Chester and Holyhead Railway by the LNWR, and primarily saw use on the Irish Mail route from London to Holyhead. They were the first locomotives to be fitted with water scoops, which could refill the tender from water troughs between the tracks without stopping. One such locomotive, No. 229 Watt, was the first to use them in non-stop run from Holyhead to Stafford in 1862, while conveying despatches relating to the Trent Affair.

Design
The Lady of the Lake class was the second type of locomotive designed by Ramsbottom. It was typical of express passenger locomotives of its era in having a single driving axle with large ( in this instance) driving wheels to achieve high speeds, while avoiding the friction associated with coupled driving wheels (Coupling was done primarily on goods locomotives, where tractive effort was more important than speed). The locomotives bore a resemblance to 2-2-2 designs by Patrick Stirling and Joseph Beattie, yet could also be regarded as a development of Alexander Allan's designs under Ramsbottom's predecessor, Francis Trevithick. They had an open cab, a smokebox door that opened vertically, and open slots on the "splashers" that covered the driving wheels.

Like Ramsbottom's earlier DX Goods design, the Lady of the Lake class made use of the Stephenson valve gear and his own screw design of reversing gear. These locomotives saw the first use of Henri Giffard's steam injector in Britain, as well as the use of a water scoop. They were all painted in the green livery used by the Northern Division. The first locomotive built, No. 184 Problem, was reputed to have gained the name because of the problem of getting the new injector to work, but the first ten engines (of which Problem was one) were fitted with a traditional crosshead pump. Her name may have a more mathematical origin, as the DX Goods locomotive No. 183 was given the name Theorem.

The first locomotives built were given  tenders, but with the introduction of water scoops for refilling en route they were replaced with  tenders.

229 Watt and The "Trent Affair" 
During the American Civil War, two Confederate diplomats travelling on the British mail packet RMS Trent were forcibly removed by Union Captain Charles Wilkes of the USS San Jacinto. This resulted in a diplomatic stand-off between the United States and Britain, and a threat of war. Despatches from the British Ambassador to Washington were eagerly awaited in London and throughout Britain. At this time, mail packets from America landed in Ireland at Queenstown: the mail was carried by rail to Kingstown, and thence by the Irish Mail route via Holyhead. The London and North Western Railway had publicly announced that they would convey the urgent mail from Holyhead to London within five hours.

Locomotives were kept ready for days on end at Queenstown, Holyhead, and Stafford in anticipation of the mail. The steamer from Kingstown arrived alongside the Admiralty pier at Holyhead at 8:15 a.m. on 7 January 1862. Within seven minutes, an Allan 2-2-2 set off to Holyhead station. Here the Allan engine was changed for No. 229 Watt, which set off for Stafford. It was hauling a short train of only three four-wheel coaches. This was the greatest non-stop distance covered by a steam train at that time. An engine change was completed at Stafford in as little as a minute and a half, and Bloomer No. 372 took the train on to Euston station, arriving at 1:13 p.m., less than five hours after the steamer had arrived at Holyhead. The Times considered the effort to be "a speed unparalleled over so long a line, crowded with ordinary traffic".

Later that year, in the 1862 International Exhibition, The LNWR exhibited a locomotive and tender fitted with the "Apparatus for supplying water to tenders whilst in motion". The catalogue made note that this was the same class that ran the "American express" on 7 January, but the locomotive selected was No. 531 Lady of the Lake, rather than Watt itself. The Lady of the Lake was awarded a bronze medal, and the entire class became known to many as the "Lady of the Lake" class.

Operations 
The Lady of the Lake class locomotives spent their initial years working the Irish Mail traffic, as well as running local express services in the Manchester, Crewe and Liverpool area. They gained a reputation as "flyers" on the Irish Mail, even though the speed required by the Post Office contract (a  average) was not particularly fast by contemporary standards. Sir Richard Moon, Chairman of the LNWR, believed that a speed of 40 mph was sufficient for an express train. The "Ladies" could keep this pace with ease, and were economical to run as well. In later years, however, as speeds and loads increased, the locomotives were used as pilots on double-headed trains, and even some branch services.

Webb's Rebuilds 

In 1873, two years after Francis Webb took over as engineer from Ramsbottom, the new General Manager William Cawkwell decided that black should be the standard colour for all locomotives. The Lady of the Lake class were thus painted as Webb added a cab roof and modified the chimneys of the entire class. When the class received replacement boilers from 1879 to 1883 they were also fitted with steam brakes (previously only the tender had brakes, and they were wooden ones) and enclosed splashers.

The "Ladies" received a very extensive rebuild from 1895–1897. This time they were fitted with enlarged boilers and larger fireboxes, round smokebox doors, crosshead vacuum pumps, new  tyres (which increased the diameter of the driving wheels to ), and cross-stays to stiffen the frames.

Withdrawal 

The faster and heavier trains on the London and North Western Railway, combined with the small, economical engines that had been favoured for decades, meant a greater number of services had to be double-headed in order to keep time. George Whale's Precursor Class, introduced in 1904, was able to haul heavy trains on its own. As the Precursors were rolling out of Crewe works, so the Ladies (and other underpowered engines such as Webb's 3-cylinder compounds) were cut up for scrap. Some of the Ladies' names (such as Scorpion, Tiger, Watt, and Havelock) were reused for Precursors. By 1907 the entire Lady of the Lake class had been scrapped.

Fleet list

References 

Lady of the Lake Class
2-2-2 locomotives
Railway locomotives introduced in 1859
Scrapped locomotives
Standard gauge steam locomotives of Great Britain